Reinhold Zech (born May 27, 1948) is a retired German football player. He spent 9 seasons in the Bundesliga with VfB Stuttgart and 1. FC Saarbrücken. The best result he achieved was 5th place.

External links
 

1948 births
Living people
German footballers
Germany under-21 international footballers
VfB Stuttgart players
1. FC Saarbrücken players
Bundesliga players
2. Bundesliga players
Association football defenders